Ronald William Howard (born March 1, 1954) is an American director, producer, screenwriter, and actor. He first came to prominence as a child actor, guest-starring in several television series, including an episode of The Twilight Zone. He gained national attention for playing young Opie Taylor, the son of Sheriff Andy Taylor (played by Andy Griffith) in the sitcom The Andy Griffith Show from 1960 through 1968. During this time, he also appeared in the musical film The Music Man (1962), a critical and commercial success. He was credited as Ronny Howard in his film and television appearances from 1959 to 1973. Howard was cast in one of the lead roles in the coming-of-age film American Graffiti (1973), and became a household name for playing Richie Cunningham in the sitcom Happy Days, a role he would play from 1974 to 1980.

In 1980, Howard left Happy Days to focus on directing, producing and sometimes writing a variety of films and television series. His films included the comedies Night Shift (1982), Splash (1984), and Cocoon (1985) as well as the fantasy Willow (1988), the thriller Backdraft (1991), and the newspaper comedy-drama film The Paper (1994). In 1995, Howard gained widespread praise and recognition in the historical docudrama Apollo 13 (1995). He continued directing such films as the biographical drama A Beautiful Mind (2001), the biographical sports drama Cinderella Man (2005), the historical drama Frost/Nixon (2008), the biographical sports drama Rush (2013), and the historical adventure film In the Heart of the Sea (2015). Howard is also known for directing the children's fantasy film How the Grinch Stole Christmas (2000) as well as the Robert Langdon film series, The Da Vinci Code (2006), Angels & Demons (2009), Inferno (2016), and Solo: A Star Wars Story (2018). He has also directed the documentary films The Beatles: Eight Days a Week (2016) and Pavarotti (2019).

Howard received the Academy Award for Best Director and Academy Award for Best Picture for A Beautiful Mind and was nominated again for the same awards for Frost/Nixon. In 2003, he was awarded the National Medal of Arts. He was inducted into the Television Hall of Fame in 2013. Howard has two stars on the Hollywood Walk of Fame for his contributions in the television and motion pictures industries.

Early life
Ron Howard was born on March 1, 1954, in Duncan, Oklahoma, the elder son of Jean Speegle, an actress, and Rance Howard, a director, writer, and actor. He has German, English, Scottish, Irish, and Dutch ancestry. His father was born with the surname "Beckenholdt" and took the stage name "Howard" in 1948 for his acting career. Rance Howard was serving three years in the United States Air Force at the time of Ron's birth. The family moved to Hollywood in 1958, the year before the birth of his younger brother Clint Howard. They rented a house on the block south of the Desilu Studios, where The Andy Griffith Show was later filmed. They lived in Hollywood for at least three years, before moving to Burbank.

Howard was tutored at Desilu Studios in his younger years but continued his schooling at Robert Louis Stevenson Elementary and David Star Jordan Junior High when not working in television, eventually graduating from John Burroughs High School. He later attended the University of Southern California's School of Cinematic Arts but did not graduate.

Howard has said he knew from a young age he might want to go into directing, thanks to his early experience as an actor.

Acting career

In 1959, Howard had his first credited film role in The Journey. He appeared in June Allyson's CBS anthology series The DuPont Show with June Allyson in the episode "Child Lost"; in The Twilight Zone episode "Walking Distance"; a few episodes of the first season of the sitcom Dennis the Menace, as Stewart, one of Dennis's friends; and several first- and second-season episodes of The Many Loves of Dobie Gillis. Howard played "Timmy" (uncredited) in "Counterfeit Gun", Season 4, Episode 2 (1960) of the TV series, The Cheyenne Show.

The Andy Griffith Show
In 1960, Howard was cast as Opie Taylor in The Andy Griffith Show. Credited as "Ronny Howard," he portrayed the son of the main character (played by Andy Griffith) for all eight seasons of the show. Recalling his experiences as a child actor on set, he commented

Additional 1960s and early 1970s roles
In the 1962 film version of The Music Man, Howard played Winthrop Paroo, the child with the lisp; the film starred Robert Preston and Shirley Jones. He also starred in the 1963 film The Courtship of Eddie's Father with Glenn Ford and Jones.

He appeared as Barry Stewart on The Eleventh Hour in 1965; on I Spy in the 1966 episode "Little Boy Lost"; as Henry Fonda's son in an ABC series, The Smith Family, in 1968; as Jodah in "Land of the Giants" in 1969; as a boy whose father was shot on Daniel Boone in 1971–72; and as an underage Marine on M*A*S*H in the episode "Sometimes You Hear the Bullet" in 1973. In the 1970s, he appeared in at least one episode of The Bold Ones, as a teenage tennis player with an illness.

Howard appeared on the 1969 Disneyland Records album The Story and Song from the Haunted Mansion. It featured the story of two teenagers, Mike (Howard) and Karen (Robie Lester), who get trapped inside the Haunted Mansion. Thurl Ravenscroft plays the Narrator, Pete Reneday plays the Ghost Host, and Eleanor Audley plays Madame Leota. Some of the effects and ideas that were planned but never permanently made it to the attraction are mentioned here: the Raven speaks in the Stretching Room, and the Hatbox Ghost is mentioned during the Attic scene. It was reissued in 1998 as a cassette tape titled A Spooky Night in Disney's Haunted Mansion and on CD in 2009.

Howard played Steve Bolander in George Lucas' coming-of-age film American Graffiti in 1973, which was the inspiration for the television series Happy Days starring Howard.

In 1974, Howard guest-starred as Seth Turner, the best friend of Jason Walton (Jon Walmsley), in The Waltons episode, "The Gift". Featured in the cast as Dr. McIvers is Ron Howard's father Rance Howard.

In 1976, Howard starred alongside John Wayne and Lauren Bacall in Don Siegel's The Shootist, the story of a Western gunfighter dying of cancer. The movie was Wayne's last although it's not true that he had cancer during the shooting of the picture; Wayne died three years later.

Happy Days
A role in an installment of series Love, American Style, titled "Love and the Television Set", led to his being cast as Richie Cunningham in the TV series Happy Days (for syndication, the segment was re-titled "Love and the Happy Days"). Beginning in 1974, he played the likeable "buttoned-down" boy, in contrast to Henry Winkler's "greaser" Arthur "Fonzie"/"The Fonz" Fonzarelli. On the Happy Days set, he developed an on- and off-screen chemistry with Winkler. Howard left Happy Days to become a film director just before the start of its eighth season in 1980, but returned for guest appearances in later seasons.

Directing career

1970s–1980s
Before leaving Happy Days in 1980, Howard made his directing debut with the 1977 low-budget comedy/action film Grand Theft Auto, based on a script he co-wrote with his father, Rance. This came after cutting a deal with Roger Corman, wherein Corman let Howard direct a film in exchange for Howard starring in Eat My Dust!, with Christopher Norris. Howard went on to direct several TV movies for NBC between 1978 and 1982, including the 1980 TV movie, Skyward, starring Bette Davis. His big directorial break came in 1982, with Night Shift, featuring Michael Keaton, Shelley Long, and Howard's Happy Days co-star Henry Winkler.

Following Night Shift, Howard directed a number of major films, including the fantasy romantic comedy Splash (1984) starring Tom Hanks, Daryl Hannah, Eugene Levy, and John Candy. The film was a box office and critical success. He also directed the science fiction comedy drama Cocoon (1985) starring Don Ameche, Hume Cronyn, Wilford Brimley, and Brian Dennehy. This film was also a critical and financial hit. In 1988, he directed the dark fantasy drama film Willow starring Val Kilmer and Warwick Davis. Howard's final work as a director for the 1980s was the family comedy film Parenthood (1989) starring an ensemble cast that includes Steve Martin, Tom Hulce, Rick Moranis, Martha Plimpton, Joaquin Phoenix, Keanu Reeves, Jason Robards, Mary Steenburgen, and Dianne Wiest. It eventually grossed over $100million domestically and $126million worldwide. The film was a critical hit and received two Academy Award nominations.

1990s

Howard continued directing through the 1990s, including the American drama Backdraft revolving around firefighters. The film starred Kurt Russell, Donald Sutherland, and Robert De Niro. Film critics Gene Siskel of the Chicago Tribune and Roger Ebert of the Chicago Sun-Times gave the film a positive review.

In 1992, he directed the western film epic Far and Away starring Tom Cruise and Nicole Kidman. Despite receiving mixed reviews from critics the film was a financial success earning 137 million against its budget of 60 million. In 1994, Howard directed the newspaper comedy drama The Paper with an ensemble starring Michael Keaton, Glenn Close, Marisa Tomei, Jason Alexander, Jason Robards, and Robert Duvall. The film received rave reviews with many praising Keaton's leading performance.

Howard's direction for the 1995 docudrama film Apollo 13 received praise from critics. The film stars Tom Hanks, Kevin Bacon, and Bill Paxton as the three astronauts members of the Apollo 13 flight crew, with supporting performances from Gary Sinise, Ed Harris, and Kathleen Quinlan. The film was a massive financial success earning $335 million off a budget of $52 million. The film received widespread critical acclaim with Roger Ebert of the Chicago Sun-Times praised the film in his review saying: "A powerful story, one of the year's best films, told with great clarity and remarkable technical detail, and acted without pumped-up histrionics." The film went on to receive nine Academy Award nominations including Best Picture.

2000s
In 2000, he directed the live action children's fantasy film, How the Grinch Stole Christmas based on the Dr. Seuss children's book. The film starred Jim Carrey as the titular character and featured performances from Jeffrey Tambor, Christine Baranski, and Molly Shannon, with Anthony Hopkins serving as the film's narrator. Despite the film receiving mixed reviews from critics, it was a financial success and earned $345 million at the box office.

Howard's followup film was the biographical drama film A Beautiful Mind starring Russell Crowe as the American mathematician John Nash who struggled with paranoid schizophrenia. The film featured performances from Jennifer Connelly, Ed Harris, Josh Lucas, and Christopher Plummer. The film received positive reviews from critics who praised Crowe's and Connelly's performances. The film went on to receive eight Academy Award nominations including a win for Best Picture and a nomination and win for Howard as Best Director.

In 2005, Howard directed the biographical sports drama Cinderella Man based on the true story of heavyweight boxing champion James J. Braddock played by Russell Crowe. The film also starred Renée Zellweger as his wife Mae Braddock, and Paul Giamatti as his trainer Joe Gould. Rotten Tomatoes gave it an approval rating of 80% based on reviews from 214 critics with an average score of 7.4/10. Its consensus states, "With grittiness and an evocative sense of time and place, Cinderella Man is a powerful underdog story. And Ron Howard and Russell Crowe prove to be a solid combination."

Howard is also known for directing the Robert Langdon films. The series began with The Da Vinci Code (2006) with Tom Hanks as Langdon, featuring performances by Audrey Tautou, Ian McKellen, and Alfred Molina. The sequel was Angels & Demons (2009) with Hanks reprising his role and performances by Ewan McGregor and Stellan Skarsgård. In 2016, Inferno was released with Hanks continuing the role with performances by Felicity Jones, Irrfan Khan, and Omar Sy.  All three films received mixed reviews but were popular among audiences.

Howard showcased the world premiere of his historical drama film Frost/Nixon at the London Film Festival in October 2008. The film is based on the taped conversations known as the Frost/Nixon interviews between former United States President Richard Nixon and British talk show host David Frost. Frank Langella portrayed Nixon opposite Michael Sheen as Frost. The film was based on the play of the same name by Peter Morgan. The film also featured performances from Mathew Macfadyen, Sam Rockwell, Rebecca Hall, Oliver Platt, Toby Jones, and Kevin Bacon. Despite losing money at the box office, the film was a critical success with website Rotten Tomatoes giving the film an approval rating of 93% with the critical consensus reading, "Frost/Nixon is weighty and eloquent; a cross between a boxing match and a ballet with Oscar worthy performances." Metacritic gives the film an average score of 80 out of 100, based on 38 critics, indicating "generally favorable reviews". The film received 5 Academy Award nominations with Howard receiving a nomination for Best Director.

Howard was the recipient of the Austin Film Festival's 2009 Extraordinary Contribution to Filmmaking Award. Michael Keaton presented him with the Award.

2010s
In 2013, Howard directed sports drama Rush, based on the Hunt–Lauda rivalry between two Formula One drivers, the British James Hunt and the Austrian Niki Lauda during the 1976 Formula 1 motor-racing season. It was written by Peter Morgan and starred Chris Hemsworth as Hunt, Daniel Brühl as Lauda, and Olivia Wilde as Suzy Miller. The film premiered at the 2013 Toronto International Film Festival and received positive reviews from critics.

In 2015, Howard directed the film In the Heart of the Sea about the sinking of the American whaling ship Essex in 1820, an event that inspired Herman Melville's 1851 novel Moby-Dick. The film featured performances by Chris Hemsworth, Cillian Murphy, Tom Holland, Ben Whishaw, and Brendan Gleeson. The film was a financial failure and received mixed reviews.

Howard took over directing duties on Solo: A Star Wars Story, a film featuring Star Wars character Han Solo in his younger years. The film was released on May 23, 2018. Howard officially replaced directors Phil Lord and Christopher Miller on June 22, 2017; they were let go from their position two days earlier, reportedly due to their refusal to compromise with Lucasfilm over the direction of the film; reportedly the directors encouraged significant improvisations by the actors, which was believed by some at Lucasfilm to be "shifting the story off-course". At the time, the film was nearly completed, with three and a half weeks left to film and another five weeks of reshoots scheduled. Howard posted on Twitter, "I'm beyond grateful to add my voice to the Star Wars Universe after being a fan since 5/25/77. I hope to honor the great work already done & help deliver on the promise of a Han Solo film."

In November 2017, Howard announced that he would be teaching his first directing class.

2020s
On November 24, 2020, Howard's drama film Hillbilly Elegy was released on Netflix. The film is based on the memoir of the same name by J. D. Vance and was adapted for the screen by Vanessa Taylor. The film stars Academy Award nominees Glenn Close and Amy Adams. The film has received widespread negative reception from critics but was received well by general audiences, with an 83% user approval on Rotten Tomatoes.

In March 2021, Howard began filming the survival drama Thirteen Lives, a film based on the Tham Luang cave rescue in 2018. It was released in select theaters on July 29, 2022, by United Artists Releasing, and began streaming on Prime Video on August 5, 2022. The film received generally positive reviews from critics.

In 2022, Netflix acquired from Paramount Pictures The Shrinking of Treehorn, which will mark Howard's first time directing an animated feature.

Imagine Entertainment
Howard is the co-chairman, with Brian Grazer, of Imagine Entertainment, a film and television production company. Imagine has produced several films including Friday Night Lights, 8 Mile, and Inside Deep Throat, as well as the television series 24, Felicity, The PJs and Arrested Development which Howard also narrated and later appeared in as himself.

In July 2012, it was announced that Imagine had put into development Conquest for Showtime, a period drama based on the 16th century conquest of the Aztecs by Spanish Conquistadors. To be directed by Howard, the series was originally planned as a feature film before it was decided that the project was more suited to television.

As part of Imagine Entertainment, he appeared in a 1997 print ad for Milk – Where's your mustache?, in which he wore a cap for Imagine Entertainment and sported a milk mustache. Earlier versions show a younger Ronny Howard on the other side.

In 2009, he appeared in the Jamie Foxx music video "Blame It".

Personal life
Howard married Cheryl Alley (born December 23, 1953) on June 7, 1975. They have four children: daughters Bryce Dallas (born March 2, 1981), twins Jocelyn Carlyle and Paige Carlyle (born February 5, 1985), and son Reed Cross (born April 13, 1987).

Filmography

Film

As actor

Documentary films

Short films

Television

Actor

Awards and nominations

Citations

General bibliography 
 Holmstrom, John. The Moving Picture Boy: An International Encyclopaedia from 1895 to 1995. Norwich, Michael Russell, 1996, p. 304-305.
 Howard, Ron and Clint Howard. The Boys: A Memoir of Hollywood and Family. William Morrow, 2021.

External links

 
 
 
 2002 Commencement Address (USC School of Cinema-Television) (archived)
 
 Encyclopedia of Oklahoma History and Culture – Howard, Ron (archived)
 

1954 births
Living people
20th-century American male actors
21st-century American male actors
American film producers
American male child actors
American male film actors
American male screenwriters
American male television actors
American male voice actors
American people of Dutch descent
American people of English descent
American people of German descent
American people of Irish descent
American people of Scottish descent
Audiobook narrators
Best Directing Academy Award winners
Best Musical or Comedy Actor Golden Globe (television) winners
Daytime Emmy Award winners
Directors Guild of America Award winners
Film directors from California
Film directors from Oklahoma
Film producers from California
Film producers from Oklahoma
Grammy Award winners
Ron
Imagine Entertainment
Male actors from Burbank, California
Male actors from California
Male actors from Greenwich, Connecticut
Male actors from Oklahoma
People from Duncan, Oklahoma
People from the San Fernando Valley
Primetime Emmy Award winners
Producers who won the Best Picture Academy Award
Screenwriters from California
Screenwriters from Oklahoma
Television producers from California
United States National Medal of Arts recipients
USC School of Cinematic Arts alumni
Writers from Oklahoma